List of Highlander episodes may refer to:

List of Highlander: The Raven episodes
List of Highlander: The Series episodes